Derakhshan is one of the neighbourhoods of DHA in Karachi, Sindh, Pakistan.

There are several ethnic groups in Darakhshan including Muhajirs, Sindhis, Punjabis, Kashmiris, Seraikis, Pakhtuns, Balochis, Memons, Bohras,  Ismailis, etc.

References

External links 
 Karachi Website .
 Darakhshan Shopping Center

Defence, Karachi
Neighbourhoods of Karachi